Seltse may refer to several localities in Bulgaria:

 Seltse, Dobrich Province
 Seltse, Lovech Province
 Seltse, Stara Zagora Province

See also
 Selce (disambiguation)